Glenoleon osmyloides is a species of antlions that occurs in Australia.

References 

Myrmeleontidae
Insects of Australia
Insects described in 1885